Daulatpur Upazila may refer to one of two Upazilas, or subdistricts, of Bangladesh:

Daulatpur Upazila, Manikganj
Daulatpur Upazila, Kushtia, in Kushtia District of Khulna Division

See also
 Daulatpur Thana, Khulna, in Khulna District of Khulna Division
 Daulatpur (disambiguation), places in Bangladesh, India, Nepal, and Pakistan